Mornantau 'Nantie' Hayward (born 6 March 1977) is a former South African cricketer, who played Tests and ODIs. He is a right-arm fast bowler, who, according to Peter Robinson, "has genuine pace, the ability to get bounce and abundant energy". He played for Derbyshire until his retirement from all cricket in 2012.

International career
At the time of Robinson's article, "Hayward [was] clearly seen as the successor to Allan Donald as the spearhead of the South African attack." However Hayward did not play a Test match after August 2004 or a One Day International after April 2002. Steve Waugh appears to have reached this conclusion in his autobiography, saying that: "I'm amazed he didn't...become world-class...a collective cheer went up in the Australian camp whenever his unpredictable raw pace was overlooked [by the South African selectors]."

Ireland career
He played for Ireland in the 2007 Friends Provident Trophy.

References

1977 births
Living people
People from Uitenhage
Eastern Province cricketers
Middlesex cricketers
South Africa One Day International cricketers
South Africa Test cricketers
South African cricketers
Worcestershire cricketers
Ireland cricketers
Dolphins cricketers
Warriors cricketers
Hampshire cricketers
Chennai Superstars cricketers
Derbyshire cricketers
Cricketers from the Eastern Cape